Ductifera is a genus of fungi in the order Auriculariales. The genus is widespread, especially in tropical regions, and contains about 11 species. The genus was circumscribed by American mycologist Curtis Gates Lloyd in 1917.

References

External links

Auriculariales
Agaricomycetes genera
Taxa named by Curtis Gates Lloyd